Tantabin Township  is a township in Taungoo District in the Bago Region of Burma (Myanmar). The principal town and administrative seat is Tantabin in the far northwest part of the township.

Notes

External links
"Tantabin Google Satellite Map" Maplandia World Gazetteer - map showing the township boundary

Townships of the Bago Region
Taungoo District